The 2S35 Koalitsiya-SV is a Russian self-propelled gun first seen in public (initially with its turret covered) in 2015 during rehearsals for the Moscow Victory Day Parade. The 2S35 is expected to supplement and eventually replace the 2S19 Msta in the Russian Ground Forces.

Development
The 2S35 was originally designed as a variant of the 2S19 Msta, consisting of a 2S19 chassis with modified turret, fitted with an over-and-under dual autoloaded 152mm howitzer. Development of this variant was abandoned in 2010.

While the dual-gun design was unsuccessful and abandoned after about ten years, the name assigned to that dual-barrel system, Coalition (because it was combining two guns with two full barrels in one unit) was retained. Serial production and originally delivery was set for 2016. Testing is expected to continue until 2020.

The 2S35 is serially manufactured since 2021 in Yekaterinburg by UralTransMash, a subsidiary of UralVagonZavod.

Design
The 2S35 is expected to have increased automation that will reduce the crew number, to perhaps just two or three people located in an armored capsule below the two front hull hatches.

Armament
Initial reports describe the main armament as a 2A88 152 mm gun with a range of up to 80 kilometers using precision-guided rounds and up to 40 km with standard rounds that are currently used on Msta-S.  The claimed average rate of fire is around 16 rounds per minute,(15+) 2S35's rate of fire was improved due to the new pneumatic loader. Estimated ammunition load is around 60-70 rounds and using a special loader vehicle the recharge time for full ammunition load is 15 minutes. The 2S35 will feature a modular ammunition charge system, which allows changing the amount of propellant used in firing of each individual shell.

The secondary armament equipped on 2S35 is a 12.7×108mm ZiD Kord Remote weapon station.

Unified command-and-control
The 2S35 is not a classic self-propelled gun, but rather a highly robotised system, with a high degree of automation. The 2S35 has a unified command-and-control system with which all actions are displayed. The system can automatically select the appropriate shell type for a task and the amount of charge required.

The turret is fully digital and can be controlled remotely through the unified command-and-control system. In the future, the turret may be placed on chassis of the T-14 Armata.

Mobility
The 2S35 was initially reported as being based on the Armata Universal Combat Platform, which in the case of the T-14 Armata and T-15 has seven road wheels. However, the 2S35's on display during the 2015 Moscow Victory Day Parade and its rehearsals are not built on the Armata platform but rather on a six-wheeled platform that appears to be a T-90 derived chassis, and later production variants are expected to be based on the unified Armata chassis.

See also
 2S19 Msta
 2S3 Akatsiya
 AS-90
 K-9 Thunder
 M1299 
 Panzerhaubitze 2000
 XM2001 Crusader

Image gallery

References

Howitzers of Russia
Self-propelled artillery of Russia
152 mm artillery
Tracked self-propelled howitzers
Uraltransmash products
Military vehicles introduced in the 2010s